DeLand-Weldon High School is a coed public secondary institution located in Piatt County, Illinois. It is a part of DeLand-Weldon Community Unit School District #57.
The school draws from an area of DeLand and Weldon and is the fourth smallest public high schools in the state of Illinois with a total enrollment of 54 students.

History
On December 7, 1957 the citizens of Unit #57 voted to build and equip a new high school on the county line midway between the two communities. The new building was erected at a cost of approximately $550,000 and provides for a four-year school, with provisions in the future to add four rooms to accommodate the seventh and eighth grades of both communities. Therefore, during the ten-year interim, the schools of DeLand-Weldon Unit #57 moved toward the original long range goal set in 1948.

Athletics
The DeLand-Weldon athletic teams participate in the East Central Illinois Conference, a high school athletic conference whose member schools have similar enrollments and are all located in the Central Illinois region. The school's teams also compete in state championship tournaments sponsored by the Illinois High School Association (IHSA). The statewide class designation is A.

The school mascot is the Eagle.

Activities
Music Solo & Ensemble
Music: Instrumental — Concert Band, Pep Band, Marching Band
Music: Vocal
Spirit
Yearbook Club
Debate Club
LifeSavers Club
Student Council
110th District Student Advisory Panel
National Honor Society
Scholastic Bowl
Cheerleading
Bass Fishing
Boys Basketball
Girls Basketball
Boys and Girls Track
Girls Volleyball
Co-Op with Cerro Gordo — Football, Baseball, Softball
Co-Op with Blue Ridge — Soccer

Notable alumni
Brielle Jones holds the Illinois High School Association girls basketball all-time individual record for most blocked shots in a season (240), and most blocked shots in a game (21)
Larry Huisinga was inducted into the Illinois Basketball Coaches Association Hall of Fame on April 28, 2012.

References

External links
DeLand-Weldon High School — official website

Educational institutions established in 1957
1957 establishments in Illinois
Buildings and structures in Piatt County, Illinois
Public high schools in Illinois